Golshahr Metro Station is the former western end of Tehran Metro Line 5. It is located in Mehrshahr in southwest of Karaj. In December 2019 Line 5 has been extended further west beyond this station to Hashtgerd.

List of services 

 ATM bank
 Taxi station
 Supermarket
 Shrine 
 Parking lot
 Bus terminal
 Escalator
 Payphone
 Toilet 
 Snack bar

References

Tehran Metro stations